Archibald Matthias Dunn FRIBA, JP, (1832 – 17 January 1917) was a British architect. He was, along with his partner Edward Joseph Hansom, among the foremost Catholic architects in North East England during the Victorian era.

Biography
Dunn was born in Wylam, Northumberland. His father was Matthias Dunn, a mining engineer and manager and one of the first Government Inspectors of Mines for the North East of England. Archibald Dunn was educated at Ushaw College and Stonyhurst College. He then went to Bristol to be apprenticed to architect Charles Francis Hansom, the younger brother of Joseph Aloysius Hansom, the inventor of the Hansom cab and founder of The Builder. It was here that Dunn met his future partner Edward Joseph Hansom, the son of his employer.

Their principal works in North East England include the tower and spire of St Mary’s Cathedral in Newcastle upon Tyne, and the church of St. Michael in Elswick, Tyne and Wear.  Dunn was also a prominent local landowner. Across the valley from Prudhoe is Castle Hill House (1878–9), which he designed and built as his own home in Wylam. Previously he had lived in Gateshead, where he was an Alderman, Mayor and a Justice of the Peace for County Durham. In 1870 Dunn was President of the Northern Architectural Association.

In 1862 Dunn married Sara Armstrong, an author. They both enjoyed travel, and in 1886 Dunn published a book entitled Notes and Sketches of an Architect, which was a collection of sketches made in France, Germany, Spain and England. Dunn's son, Archibald Manuel Dunn, was taken into partnership of the firm in 1887, and it became Dunn, Hansom & Dunn. 

In 1894, W. Ellison Fenwicke also became a partner in the firm. In 1903, the younger Dunn withdrew. Fenwicke continued to run the firm with various partners and under various styles, the final practice being Dunn Hansom & Fenwicke although Fenwicke by then was the only active partner. 

Dunn retired between 1883 and 1887. In 1901 the Dunns moved to Wood House, Branksome Park, in Bournemouth, where he died on 17 January 1917 aged 85.

Buildings designed by Dunn

1854  Saint Mary’s RC Church, Blackhill

1858  National School, Blyth

1858  St. Andrew’s Cemetery, Hexham

1858  St. Joseph’s RC Church, Gateshead

1860  St Anthony of Padua RC Church, Walker, Newcastle

1858  Our Lady and St Wilfrid RC Church, Blyth

1869  St George’s RC Church, Bells Close, Lemington

1873  Saint Dominic’s RC Church, Newcastle

18??  St. Nicholas’ Cemetery, Newcastle.

1868  Prudhoe Hall, Prudhoe

1868  Mining Institute/Wood Memorial Hall, Newcastle

1869–1873 St  Dominic's Church, Newcastle

1878  Castle Hill House, Wylam.

Dunn & Hansom

1860  Spire of Saint Mary’s Cathedral, Newcastle

1873–1882  Transepts and base of tower, Downside Abbey, Somerset

1876  Saint Matthew’s School (mainly Hansom), South Road, Prudhoe

1882  Alterations to Pugin’s Chapel, Ushaw

1888  Lady Chapel, Downside Abbey

Dunn, Hansom & Dunn

1885  Church of Our Lady and the English Martyrs, Cambridge  

1887  Medical School, Northumberland Road, Newcastle 

1887-1937  Durham University College of Medicine; housed the Dental School of the University of Durham 1945-78; and from 1978, the Law School of the University of Northumbria

1888–1889  St Benet's Church, Sunderland

1891  St Michael’s RC Church, Westmorland Rd, Newcastle

1891  Our Lady and St Cuthbert RC Church, Prudhoe

1893  Our Lady and St Joseph's Church, Carlisle

1893  St Joseph’s Church, Hartlepool

References

Further reading
Johnson, Michael A., 'The architecture of Dunn & Hansom of Newcastle' (Newcastle upon Tyne: University of Northumbria, MA Dissertation, 2003)
Johnson, Michael A., 'Architects to a Diocese: Dunn and Hansom of Newcastle' in Northern Catholic History, No.49, 2008, pp3–17.
Johnson, Michael A., ‘English Gothic, Early Perpendicular Style’ in Zeilinski, P. (2007) The Church That Moved. Hebburn: Smith Bros.

External links
Dunn on Parks and Gardens UK
Dunn and The Church of Our Lady and the English Martyrs, Cambridge

1832 births
1917 deaths
19th-century English architects
Gothic Revival architects
English ecclesiastical architects
Architects of Roman Catholic churches
Fellows of the Royal Institute of British Architects
English Roman Catholics
People from Wylam
People educated at Stonyhurst College
Architects of cathedrals
Alumni of Ushaw College
Architects from Northumberland